The Nazi ghost train is the popular name for a train that, at the beginning of September 1944, was intended to transport the political prisoners and Allied airmen held at Saint-Gilles prison in Brussels, to camps in Germany.

Role
The train was intended to transport the political prisoners and Allied airmen held at Saint-Gilles prison in Brussels, to camps in Germany. Its mission was thwarted by Belgian railway men who delayed the progress of the train for so long that, with the approaching Allies entering the city, the Germans abandoned the idea. They released the political prisoners (but not the Allied POWs) at Klein-Eiland/La Petite-Ile station in Brussels, using the train instead to take troops back to Germany. Note that 'ghost train' is something of a misnomer since both the Germans and (especially) the Belgian railway workers knew exactly where the train was at all times.

Description
The train itself comprised thirty or so goods wagons formed up by the German SS troops at Bruxelles Midi Railway Station. It was occupied by 1,370 political prisoners and 41 Allied airmen from Saint-Gilles prison, and destined for prison camps in Germany.

The train had been scheduled to leave in the early morning of Saturday 2 September 1944 but was delayed by railway workers until nearly five o'clock in the afternoon. Further delaying tactics resulted in the train only getting as far at Mechelen that evening and then diverting to Muizen for water replenishment. On leaving Muizen station next morning, further problems (mostly due to sabotage) were encountered and the train eventually returned to Klein-Eiland/La Petite-Ile at 10:15 Sunday morning. More (deliberate) confusion resulted in the locomotive for the train being detached and no suitable replacement being found. Following negotiations with various officials, including the Red Cross, the political prisoners were released from the train at 12.30 and the Germans took the train over for their own troops that afternoon. The train only got as far as Schaerbeek that evening before it was shunted into the railway yards there. In the confusion, several wagons, including the one holding the POWs, were derailed and abandoned. The POWs escaped in small groups throughout the night.

See also
Nacht und Nebel

References

Further reading
 Lokker, Claude (1985) "Des bâtons dans les roues : Les cheminots belges durant la deuxième guerre mondiale".
 Clutton-Brock, Oliver (2009) "RAF Evaders - The comprehensive story of thousands of escapers and their escape lines, Western Europe. 1940-1945".
 MI9 and IS9 escape and evasion reports from the National Archives, Kew.
 MIS-X escape and evasion reports from the US National Archives, Maryland.

The Holocaust in Belgium
1944 in Belgium
World War II prisoners of war
Belgian Resistance